La Sept is a 1989 promotional album of music for La Sept written by Michael Nyman and performed by the Michael Nyman Band.  It is Nyman's fourteenth release.  Gabrielle Lester makes her debut with the band on this album.  After a 13-year hiatus (at least from recording) with the band, she would replace the departing Alexander Balanescu as concertmaster for The Michael Nyman Band during the recording of Facing Goya, and, as of 2008, remains in that position.  Musical passages created for La Sept were later re-used for the piece The Final Score which is featured in the album After Extra Time.

Track listing
Ouverture (1:04)
L'Après-Midi (0:47)
Le Soir (0:48)
La Nuit (0:48)La Sept, Suite
Untitled (1:24)
Untitled (0:54)
Untitled (1:21)
Untitled (2:48)
Untitled (1:29)
Untitled (1:25)
Untitled (1:30)
Untitled (2:14)
Untitled (1:31)
Untitled (0:21)
Untitled (2:55)

Personnel
Michael Nyman, composer, piano, conductor
Elisabeth Perry, Fenella Barton, Gabrielle Lester, Iris Juda, Jackie Shave, Jonathan Rees, Lyn Fletcher, Mayumi Seiler, Mike McMeneny*, Richard Ehrlich, violin
Kate Musker, Roger Tapping, viola
Jane Salmen, Tim Hugh, Tony Hinnigan, cello
Lynda Herighten, double bass
Martin Elliott, bass guitar
David Rix, clarinet
John Harle, soprano saxophone
David Roach, alto saxophone
Andrew Findon, Tenor, baritone saxophone
David Stuart, trombone
Richard Watkins, horn
Sylvie Caspar - voice
Producer - David Cunningham, Philippe Truffaut
Engineer - Michael Dutton*
Mixed by, edited by - Jean-Philippe Goude

References

1989 soundtrack albums
Theatre soundtracks
Michael Nyman soundtracks
Promotional albums